

Albums

Studio albums

Live albums

Compilation albums

Singles 
 2006: "Zieh die Schuh aus" (GER #71)
 2006: "So geil Berlin" 
 2006: "Ich atme ein" (GER #74)
 2006: "Murphys Gesetz" (Promo Single)
 2007: "Frauen regier'n die Welt" (GER #7, AUT #51, SWI #64)
 2007: "Guess who rules the world" (Online Single)
 2007: "Die Liste" 
 2007: "Bin heute Abend bei dir" (Online Single)
 2008: "Wovon träumst du nachts?" (Online Single)
 2008: "Alle Möbel verrückt" live
 2009: "Nicht Artgerecht"
 2009: "Seine Ruhe"
 2010: "Tabu"
 2011: "In Diesem Moment"
 2012: "Für nichts auf dieser Welt"
 2014: "Wenn es morgen schon zu Ende wär'"
 2014: "Du bist mein Sommer"
 2017: "Eine Nummer zu groß"

DVDs 
 2007: Roger Cicero: Männersachen Live! (Recorded on February 18, 2007, in Frankfurt/Main)
 2008: Roger Cicero - Beziehungsweise Live (Recorded on February 13, 2008, in Berlin)
 2010: Roger Cicero - Live at Montreux 2010  (Recorded on July 12, 2010, at the Montreux Jazz Festival)
 2015:  Roger Cicero - Cicero Sings Sinatra - Live in Hamburg (Recorded on September 7–8, 2015 in Hamburg)

References

External links
  
 

Discographies of German artists